The German Type UE I submarine was an ocean-going single-hull submarine with saddle tanks built by AG Vulkan in Hamburg and Kaiserliche Werft Danzig. Armed with a single torpedo tube forward and aft, plus one  SK L/30 deck gun (U-72 received a  SK L/45 gun in 1917), its main weapon were the 38 mines in two minelaying tubes. The boats were crewed by four officers and 28 men for a complement of 32.

Citations

References

Submarine classes
German Type UE I submarines
World War I submarines of Germany